XLISP is a family of Lisp implementations written by David Betz and first released in 1983.

The first version was a Lisp with object-oriented extensions for computers with limited power. The second version (XLISP 2.0) moved toward Common Lisp, but was by no means a complete implementation. After a long period of inactivity, the author released a new version based on XSCHEME, his Scheme implementation. The most current version follows the Scheme R3RS standard.

Derivatives
 AutoLISP, a programming and scripting language for AutoCAD, is based on a very old version of XLISP.
 XLISP-PLUS is a derivative of XLISP 2.0 that continues to add Common Lisp features. Winterp is a derivative of XLISP-PLUS.
 XLISP-STAT is an implementation of Lisp-Stat, an environment for dynamic graphics and statistics with objects.
 Nyquist is an extension of XLISP for sound synthesis.
 ANIMAL (AN IMage ALgebra) is an image manipulation environment created by Carla Maria Modena and Roberto Brunelli.
 A 1989 entry to the IOCCC identifies itself as "XLISP 4.0".

References

External links
 
 .
 .
 .
 .
 .

Lisp programming language family
Scheme (programming language)
Object-oriented programming languages
CP/M software